WWV may refer to:

 The World as Will and Representation, a philosophical book by Arthur Schopenhauer
 Wagner-Werk-Verzeichnis, an index to the musical works of Richard Wagner
 Weera Wickrama Vibhushanaya, a Sri Lanakan military decoration
 WWV (radio station), a shortwave radio station which broadcasts official U.S. Government time signals
 Wayne Wheeled Vehicles, a manufacturer of school buses in the 1990s
 World War Veterans, a progressive organisation of American veterans of World War I